Likhohlong is a community council located in the Quthing District of Lesotho. Its population in 2006 was 7,455.

Villages
The community of Likhohlong includes the villages of:

Danger's Hoek
Diphani
Ha Khoro
Ha Machakela
Ha Makhalanyane
Ha Motsapi
Ha Mpeka
Ha Mphojoa
Ha Nkoto
Ha Sekhobe
Ha Selebalo

Ha Shemane
Ha Tšoene
Khokhobeni
Khubetsoana
Langeni
Lekhalong
Lelibohong (Thotaneng)
Lichecheng
Mafikeng
Mankoaneng
Marakabei

Marakong (Ha Qoi)
Mathole (Dekeni)
Meriting
Mokapeleng
Mokhethoana
Motheaneng
Motse-Mocha
Motsekuoa
Nkoeng
Nkotjene
Nomfuthoane

Pakeletso
Patisi
Phuthing
Royvaal
Sandlulube
Sethepung
Silase
Stationeng
Thabong
Tlhakoaneng
Waterfall

References

External links
 Google map of community villages

Populated places in Quthing District